Atemar (Atämaŕ) is a rural locality (a selo) in Lyambirsky District of the Republic of Mordovia, Russia. Population:

References

Rural localities in Mordovia
Lyambirsky District
Saransky Uyezd